is a Japanese geneticist known for contributing  to clarify epigenetic regulations during gametogenesis and embryogenesis through investigation of genomic imprinting as a model. He participates in the International Human Epigenome Consortium [IHEC].

Biography
Sasaki was born in Fukuoka, Japan in 1956, and received his MD and PhD in 1982 and 1987, respectively, from Kyushu University. He was appointed as a professor of the National Institute of Genetics in 1998. He has been a professor at the Medical Institute of Bioregulation, Kyushu University since 2010, where he has been serving as a dean since 2012. He has been a vice president of Kyushu University since 2015, and a dean of the Institute for Advanced Study, Kyushu University since 2018.

Awards
2009: The Japan Society of Human Genetics award
2012: Kihara Award of the Genetics Society of Japan
2015: Purple Ribbon Medal

References

External links
 Videos of keynote speakers in Vienna - Hiroyuki Sasaki
 Hiroyuki Sasaki (Kyushu University)
 IHEC Japan

Japanese geneticists
Living people
1956 births
Academic staff of Kyushu University
Kyushu University alumni
Recipients of the Medal with Purple Ribbon